The Kanas River is a river in Altay Prefecture, Xinjiang Uygur Autonomous Region, China. It starts from Khüiten Peak, runs at the foot of the Altai Mountains, and through the Kanas Lake. At its confluence with the Hemu River, the Burqin River is formed.

Overview
The Kanas River is the northernmost river of Xinjiang Uygur Autonomous Region. It starts from the southwestern foot of the Tavan Bogd massif, on the border of the three countries China, Mongolia and Russia, and runs along the foot of the Altai Mountains. It then that flows into the Kanas Lake as the Upper Kanas River, and flows out of the Kanas Lake as the Lower Kanas River.

Upper Kanas River
The Kanas River begins at the southwest foot of Yuyi Mountain of the Tawan Bogd massif, runs at the foot of Altai Mountains, collecting water from other rivers, and flows into the northern end of the Kanas Lake.

Lower Kanas River 
The river that flows out from the southern end of the Kanas Lake is also called the Kanas River. It runs down through the scenic spots, such as Shenxian Bay (神仙湾), Moon Bay(月亮湾), and Wolong Bay (臥龍湾). At its confluence with the Hemu River  (禾木河), the Burqin River (布尔津河) is formed, which further runs down into the Irtysh and Ob Rivers, and finally enters the Arctic Ocean.

References

External links 
Photos of Kanas River 
Photos of Kanas River in Chinese

Rivers of Xinjiang
Altay Prefecture